Sergio Vento (born May 30, 1938) is an Italian diplomat, former Permanent Representative of Italy to the United Nations and Italian Ambassador to the United States.

Career
Sergio Vento was born in Rome.
He studied Political Sciences at the State University of Rome.

After having served in various positions in The Hague, Buenos Aires and Ankara, he had been a diplomatic councillor to the following Italian Prime Ministers: Giuliano Amato, Carlo Azeglio Ciampi, Silvio Berlusconi, Lamberto Dini. He served as Italian Ambassador to Yugoslavia, France, United Nations, United States of America. He retired from the career and become active in the following fields: law consulting, banking, infrastructures, and University teaching. A significant number of his relatives are American of Italian descent.

Honours
 Order of Merit of the Italian Republic 1st Class / Knight Grand Cross – June 2, 1994
 1999, Commandeur of the Légion d'honneur, France.
 2003, honorary Doctorate of Law, St. John's University in New York.

See also 
 Ministry of Foreign Affairs (Italy)
 Foreign relations of Italy

References

Living people
1938 births
Permanent Representatives of Italy to the United Nations
Ambassadors of Italy to the United States
Ambassadors of Italy to Yugoslavia
Ambassadors of Italy to France
Knights Grand Cross of the Order of Merit of the Italian Republic